Bryan Thompson is a Canadian lightweight rower. He won a gold medal at the 1993 World Rowing Championships in Račice with the lightweight men's eight.

References

Year of birth missing (living people)
Canadian male rowers
World Rowing Championships medalists for Canada
Living people